The Arena Polarica, also called Kuben, is an indoor ice hockey arena in Haparanda, Sweden. Opened in 1990, it has a capacity of 1500 spectators, and serves as the home arena for Asplöven HC of the HockeyAllsvenskan.

External links
Arena Polarica on eurohockey.com

Indoor arenas in Sweden
Indoor ice hockey venues in Sweden